Evgeny Vladimirovich Kuznetsov (born 12 April 1990) is a Russian diver. At the diving portion of the 2011 World Aquatics Championships he won a bronze in the 3 m springboard, and was the part of the pair who won the silver medal in the 3 m synchronised springboard.

Kuznetsov won a silver medal for his country at the 2012 Summer Olympics, in the 3 m synchronised springboard with Ilya Zakharov. At the 2016 Summer Olympics, Kuznetsov again competed in both the 3 m springboard and the 3 m synchronised springboard diving.  At the 2017 World Aquatics Championships in Budapest, Hungary, the Russian won his first gold medal in 3 m synchronized springboard, with his partner Ilya Zakharov.

References

External links

1990 births
Russian male divers
Divers at the 2012 Summer Olympics
Divers at the 2016 Summer Olympics
Olympic divers of Russia
Medalists at the 2012 Summer Olympics
Olympic medalists in diving
Olympic silver medalists for Russia
Living people
Sportspeople from Stavropol
World Aquatics Championships medalists in diving
Universiade medalists in diving
Universiade gold medalists for Russia
Universiade silver medalists for Russia
Universiade bronze medalists for Russia
Medalists at the 2013 Summer Universiade
Medalists at the 2017 Summer Universiade
Divers at the 2020 Summer Olympics